The 1968 FIBA Africa Championship for Women was the 2nd FIBA Africa Championship for Women, played under the rules of FIBA, the world governing body for basketball, and the FIBA Africa thereof. The tournament was hosted by the United Arab Republic from September 9 to 15, 1968.

The United Arab Republic ended the round-robin tournament with a 4–0 unbeaten record to win their second title.

Participating teams

Schedule

Final standings

Awards

External links
Official Website

References

1968 in Egyptian sport
1968 in African basketball
1968
International basketball competitions hosted by Egypt